Legislative elections were held in South Korea on 11 April 2012. The election was won by the ruling Saenuri or New Frontier Party, which renewed its majority in the National Assembly, despite losing seats. The election has been read as a bellwether for the presidential election to be held later in the year. The result confounded exit polls and media analysis, which had predicted a closer outcome.

Background
The South Korean National Assembly consists of 246 directly elected seats and 54 nationwide proportional representation seats chosen under an FPTP-PR parallel voting system. In South Korea's presidential system, the head of state chooses the cabinet, but the loss of control in the parliament could have hampered President Lee's government substantially.

Political parties

Four parties won seats in the 2012 election:
 Saenuri Party (Saenuri-dang), led by Park Geun-hye. The largest conservative party and incumbent government. Formerly name the Grand National Party, the party was renamed in February after a period of internal crisis in which an Emergency Response Commission assumed control of the party.
 Democratic United Party (Minju Tonghap-dang), led by Han Myeong-sook. The largest liberal party and principal opposition.
 Liberty Forward Party (Jayu Seonjin-dang), led by Sim Dae-pyung. The second-largest conservative party with its primary support base in Chungcheong.
 Unified Progressive Party (Tonghap Jinbo-dang), led jointly by Rhyu Si-min, Lee Jung-hee, and Sim Sang-jeong. The largest left-progressive party.

Other parties that put forward candidates included the left-wing New Progressive Party and the centre-right Korea Vision Party.

The conservative parties were fragmented, particularly between Saenuri and the new KVP over the latter recruiting high-profile defected members of the incumbent party and those who were denied tickets in the election, which was also reflective of a division grew between Park's leadership and loyalists of Lee Myung-bak. However, the DUP–UPP coalition also came under strain due to irregularities in the UPP's primaries that involved co-leader Lee Jung-hee.

Campaign
Campaigning for the election officially began on 29 March, though party leaders toured the country beforehand to rally support for their bids. The international media suggested that the main issues in the campaign were economic, including inflation, educational and housing costs, unemployment and underemployment, the income gap, and social welfare, while the North Korean issue did not play a role.

The opposition DUP tried to harness discontent with the incumbent Lee's administration, and called on the electorate to adjudge the election as a referendum on Lee's presidency. The opposition coalition endeavored to depict the ruling party as unsocial and favoring the rich, while promising to create jobs. The incumbent government emphasised the threat of North Korea and made the case for continuing their hard line towards the northern neighbour and maintaining a close alliance with the United States. They accused the opposition of jeopardising the free trade agreement with the U.S. The DUP had demanded renegotiation of the treaty and threatened to cancel it in case of the United States' refusal to negotiate.

The international media highlighted the candidacy of Cho Myung-chul, a professor who defected from North Korea in 1994. In its newspaper Rodong Sinmun, the North Korean Workers' Party called on the electorate to vote out the incumbent government: "Young voters, students and people must deliver a crushing defeat to the traitors."

Scandals
After accusations of unauthorized government surveillance surfaced, legislators called for an investigation, while the ruling party accused the previous government of doing the same. The presidential office published an analysis stating that 84% of the recorded incidents had taken place under the previous administration of Roh Moo-hyun. A post-election analysis by polling institute Realmeter showed that the ruling party's handling of scandal was effective, and that the surveillance scandal didn't affect voters' decision much. A DUP candidate, Kim Yong-min, was also accused of having made numerous offensive comments on the podcast-talk-show Naneun Ggomsuda, for which he apologized but refused to rescind his candidacy, despite the DUP leadership advising him to do so. Kim subsequently failed to win his seat in the election.

Opinion polling
Polls were barred in the final week of the election, just before indications suggested the two largest parties would get somewhere between 130–135 seats each. A high turnout, particularly with the youth, was seen as beneficial to the opposition.

Results
The voting centres were open from 6:00−18:00. Voting occurred via electronic ballot counting and scanning that gave an instantaneous result. Cho Myung-chul's successful candidature was the first time that one of the 23 thousand North Korean refugees living in the South was elected to the National Assembly.

By region

The result showed considerable regional variations. The DUP and its coalition partner the UPP made significant gains in the north-west of the country, winning a combined total of 26 new seats in Seoul, four in Incheon and 14 in suburban Gyeonggi-do. Altogether the DUP-UPP coalition won 70 of 112 seats in this region, a gain of 44. They also maintained their dominant position in Jeolla and Jeju, winning 31 of 33 seats, a gain of three. Had the liberal parties made comparable gains in the eastern half of the country, they would have won the election. They won only 13 seats of 100 in these provinces, a net gain of one. In Chungcheong, Gangwon and Gyeongsang, the Saenuri Party made gains from the DUP and the Liberty Forward Party. The liberal parties failed to make significant gains in the southeast, a traditionally conservative region. The Saenuri Party also took seats from independent members across the country.

Reactions and aftermath
President Lee said that the "people made wise choices. The government will do its best to manage state affairs in a stable manner and take care of the people's livelihood". The DUP's secretary-general Park Sun-sook conceded the election and added: "The DUP failed to turn public calls for punishing the ... ruling party into reality. We apologise for disappointing supporters. We will sincerely think over what today's election means and try ceaselessly to be reborn as a party the people can lean and rely on." Sim Dae-pyung, leader of the Liberty Forward Party, announced his resignation after the party's poor performance.

On 13 April, the DUP leader Han Myeong-sook announced her resignation on account of her party's defeat.

See also
List of members of the National Assembly (South Korea), 2012–2016

Notes

1. Comparison includes the Pro-Park Coalition, which split from and subsequently reintegrated with the Grand National Party.
2. This survey asked separate questions on party support and voting intention. The latter result is reported here.
3. This survey dealt specifically with seats allocated by proportional representation.

References

External links
 Korea Society Podcast: Korea’s Legislative Elections: The Day After, 12 April 2012

Legislative elections in South Korea
2012 elections in South Korea